Pomadasys maculatus, commonly known as the saddle grunt, blotched grunt or blotched javelin, is a species of marine ray-finned fish, a grunt belonging to the family Haemulidae. It is native to the Indo-West Pacific region.

Description
Pomadasys maculatus has a body which is around two and half times as long as it is deep. It has a blunt head with a convex upper profile and a small mouth which has brush like bands of teeth on its jaws. The dorsal fin has 12 spines and 13-15 soft rays while the anal fin has 3 spines and 6-8, normally 7, soft rays. It has an overall silvery grey colour with a purplish or brownish head, there are a series of broken vertical bars across the nape and back, the bar on the nape being the most obvious. The spined part of the dorsal fin has a large black blotch, the dorsal and caudal fins have black margins while the remaining fins are yellowish.

Distribution
Pomadasys maculatus has a wide Indo-Pacific distribution. It is found along the east African coast from the Red Sea south to the Eastern Cape Province in South Africa, across the Indian Ocean, including the Seychelles and the Mascarenes. Its range extends as far east as Queensland and Papua New Guinea and north to southern Japan.

Habitat and biology
It is an amphidromous species found in open bays and estuaries. It feeds on crustaceans or fishes. It is an oviparous species which forms distinct pairs for spawning.

Systematics
Pomadfasys maculatus was first formally described in 1793 as Anthias maculatus by the German naturalist Marcus Elieser Bloch (1723–1799) with the type locality given as the East Indies. The specific name maculatus means "spotted", referring to the blotches across the back and nape.

Utilisation
Pomadasys maculatus is commercially fished for throughout its range. It is caught using bottom trawls, handlines, set nets, traps, and spears. It is often quite abundant in areas used to trawl for prawns. The catch is sold fresh, with a  quantities being preserved by either salting or smoking.

References

External links
 Blotched Javelin @ Fishes of Australia

maculatus
Fish of the Indian Ocean
Fish of Thailand
Marine fish of Northern Australia
Marine fauna of East Africa
Fish described in 1793